Barry Township may refer to:
 Barry Township, Pike County, Illinois
 Barry Township, Michigan
 Barry Township, Pine County, Minnesota
 Barry Township, Schuylkill County, Pennsylvania

Township name disambiguation pages